Md. Matiur Rahman is a Bangladesh Awami League politician and the former Member of Parliament of Sunamganj-4.

Career
Rahman was elected to parliament from Sunamganj-4 as a Bangladesh Awami League candidate in 2009 in a by-election following the death of Momtaj Iqbal, the incumbent. He is the President of Sunamganj District unit of Bangladesh Awami League.

References

Awami League politicians
Living people
9th Jatiya Sangsad members
Year of birth missing (living people)